World number 1 ranked male tennis players is a year-by-year listing of the male tennis players who were ranked as world No. 1 by various contemporary and modern sources. The annual source rankings from which the No. 1 players are drawn are cited for each player's name, with a summary of the most important tennis events of each year also included. If world rankings are not available, recent rankings by tennis writers for historical years are accessed, with the dates of the recent rankings identified. In the period 1948–1953, when contemporary professional world rankings were not created, the U.S. professional rankings are cited.

History of rankings

Before 1912
For the period between the birth of lawn tennis to 1912, few contemporary worldwide rankings exist. Some national tennis federations such as the USLTA (USTA) in the United States did create national rankings, however. Also, British publications ranking British players are listed. Retrospective world rankings made by the International Tennis Hall of Fame are also listed.

Between 1912 and 1973: opinion-based rankings and professional series rankings
Before the Open Era of tennis arrived in 1968, opinion-based rankings for amateur players were generally compiled either for a full year of play or in September following the U.S. Championships. Professional players were ranked by journalists, promoters, and players' associations in opinion-based rankings either at the end of the year or in the spring or summer when the world pro tours finished. There were also performance-based point ranking systems attached to professional tournament series in 1946, 1959, 1960, 1964, 1965, 1966, 1967 and 1968, and performance-based pro rankings from the pro tours in 1942, 1954, 1961, and 1963. Even for amateurs, however, there was no single official overall ranking that encompassed the entire world. Instead, national rankings were compiled by the national tennis association of each country, with world rankings being the preserve of tennis journalists or newspaper reporters. The end-of-year amateur rankings issued by official organizations such as the United States Lawn Tennis Association were based on judgments and opinions and not on mathematical formulae assigning points for wins and losses.

Professional tennis in Europe before 1926
Thomas Burke, tutor of the Tennis Club de Paris and former teacher of two-time Wimbledon champion Joshua Pim, was reportedly as good a player as the leading amateurs. Charles Haggett was the best English teaching professional during the early 20th century. In 1913, Haggett settled in the United States, having been invited by the West Side Tennis Club of Forest Hills, New York and became the coach of the American Davis Cup team. In practice matches, he beat the leading amateurs Anthony Wilding, Wimbledon winner and Maurice McLoughlin, Wimbledon All Comer's winner.

In the 1920s, Karel Koželuh, Albert Burke (son of Thomas Burke), and Roman Najuch were probably the most notable, as well as the best, of these players. The Bristol Cup, held at Beaulieu or at Cannes on the French Riviera and won seven consecutive times by Koželuh, was "the world's only significant pro tennis tournament." Koželuh went on to become one of the best of the touring professionals in the 1930s. He and Burke, however, were not listed among the top players before 1928, as this was the first year when a retrospective ranking was published for all the top players, amateur and professional.

Major professional tournaments before 1968

Three major tournaments held a certain tradition and usually had the best of the leading players. The most prestigious of the three was generally the London Indoor Professional Championship. Played in most years between 1934 and 1990 at the Wembley Arena in the United Kingdom, the tournament was authorised by the Lawn Tennis Association from the 1950s onwards. The oldest of the three was the United States Professional Championship, played between 1927 and 1999 (except 1944 and 1996) with the approval and participation of the USPLTA from 1928 to 1954. In 1950, the USPLTA U.S. Pro was held in Cleveland. In 1951, the USPLTA U.S. Pro was held at Forest Hills, however there was also in 1951 the PTPA-approved U.S. Pro (under the billed name International Pro) held at Cleveland. Between 1952–53 and 1955–62 the PTPA version of the U.S. Pro was played in Cleveland (under the billed name International or World Professional Championships). The USPLTA U.S. Pro was held again at the L.A. Tennis Club in 1954 under Kramer's management, however the Cleveland version of the U.S. Pro was also held in 1954 under the billed name World Professional Championships. The third major tournament was the French Professional Championship, played at Roland Garros in the years 1930–1932, 1934–1939, 1956, 1958–62 and 1968, and at Stade Coubertin from 1963 to 1967. The British and American championships continued into the Open Era, but devolved to the status of minor tournaments.

These three tournaments (Wembley Pro, French Pro and U.S. Pro) through 1967 are often referred to retrospectively as the major pro events by tennis historians. However, in some years other tournaments had stronger fields and larger money prizes. The 1957 Forest Hills Tournament of Champions was broadcast live in its entirety on the CBS national television network in the U.S. The Forest Hills professional tournament in 1966 boasted the largest prize money of the season, and a film was made of the final. The Wimbledon Pro in 1967 was broadcast complete in colour on BBC television in Britain and awarded the largest prize money of any pro tournament up to that time.

Before 1973, there were only a few rankings based on the points players obtained for achieving a certain level of performance in particular tournaments, but there were journalists or officials (on their personal behalf) or promoters or players themselves who listed their own subjective annual rankings. In 1946, 1959, 1960 and 1964–1968 there were point ranking systems and seeding lists applied to professional series of tournaments involving all of the best pros. In 1946, 1959 and 1960 there were also World Professional Championship tours with a small number of pros, which did not produce point rankings. The winners of the 1946, 1959 and 1960 World Professional Championship Tours were described as "world champion" in many reports, although the points ranking system in 1959 was also referred to in Kramer's brochure with the term "World Championship Tennis". In 1961 and 1963, the ITPTA World Championship Tour produced an official ranking order for the contract professionals. In some years, however, only a small number of professional promoters, players or journalists released opinion-based rankings at the end of the tennis year. Retrospective opinion-based-rankings by tennis historians or sports statisticians many years after the tennis year ended (e.g. in the 2000s for a year in the 1950s) are also listed.

From 1973 onward: modern ATP rankings

In August 1973, the Association of Tennis Professionals (ATP) introduced its own rankings. These mathematical merit-based rankings were published 11 times that year and with increasing frequency the following years until they were published weekly from 1979 onward. In the 1970s and 1980s they did not take into account certain events, such as the Davis Cup, the WCT Finals and the year-end Masters (currently named the ATP Finals). Stan Smith, a leading player in the 1970s when ATP rankings started said "there was a great deal of conversation and tweaking during the formative years as to the weight of the various tournaments and even the weight of the rounds in the tournaments. The prize money per round was also debated in conjunction with the ranking points." Since 1990 the ATP has awarded points for the ATP Finals.

Disputed rankings
In the early years after the ATP rankings were introduced, other rankings proposed by tennis experts or by the players themselves were possibly more accurate because they included those events and adjusted the rankings to reflect the actual importance of particular tournaments. In 1977, Connors was No. 1 in the ATP ranking but Borg and Vilas were the men that received most No. 1 rankings from other sources. Since the 1990s, the ATP rankings have generally been accepted as the official rankings. Since 1978 the ITF (represented initially by a panel of experts consisting of Don Budge, Lew Hoad and Fred Perry) designated the yearly ITF World Champions.

Some recent tennis writers provide rankings for certain players in the distant past on the basis of periods, for example Kramer ranked as No. 1 for the period 1946 to 1953.  Notations will be made for annual No. 1 rankings derived from a period ranking.

List of No. 1 ranked players

1877–1911: National and world rankings
Early tennis era rankings are more variable in nature due to limited sourcing. Few contemporary worldwide rankings exist for this period.

1912–present: Annual and year-end rankings
From 1912 sources are more detailed and better documented. All players who received a world number one ranking citation during the year are listed in the number one column.

Open Era
Professional players were allowed to compete with amateurs in one unified tour starting 1968 (all players in the Open Era are professional unless otherwise indicated).

See also

 List of ATP number 1 ranked singles tennis players
 ITF World Champions
 Top ten ranked male tennis players
 Top ten ranked male tennis players (1912–1972)
 World number 1 ranked female tennis players

Notes

References

Bibliography

 
 
 
 
 
  This is a detailed account of Ken Rosewall's career with many statistics and, in particular, his annual rankings during his professional career.
 
  Has details about the pre–World War I players.
 . Riggs's autobiography has information about the 1946 professional tour that is slightly different from the other sources. He also writes at length about his 1948 tour with Kramer but says nothing about his playing record in 1947, about which there is much conflicting information.
 
  Apparently based mostly on information drawn from the French sports magazine L'Équipe, this is an updated edition of his earlier book Vainqueurs 1946–1991. Both books list the winners of many professional tournaments and matches for the years shown in their titles, but the earlier book also listed the runner-ups, scores, and the exact dates as well as some commentary by the author for each year.

External links
 ATP Awards Honour Roll at the Association of Tennis Professionals
 ITF World Champions at the International Tennis Federation
 History of the Pro Tennis Wars, by Ray Bowers:
 Chapter I: Suzanne Lenglen and the First Pro Tour
 Chapter II, Part 1: The eminence of Karel Kozeluh and Vincent Richards 1927–1928
 Chapter II, Part 2: Deja vu 1929–1930
 Chapter III: Tilden's Year of Triumph in 1931
 Chapter IV: Tilden and Nusslein, 1932–1933
 Chapter V: The Early Ascendancy of Vines, 1934
 Chapter VI: Vines's Second Year: 1935
 Chapter VII: Awaiting Perry, 1936
 Chapter VIII: Perry and Vines, 1937
 Chapter IX: Readying for Budge, 1938
 Chapter X: Budge's Great Pro Year, 1939
 Chapter XI: America, 1940–1941
 Chapter XII: America, 1942
 Chapter XIII: The high war years, 1943–1945

 
1
1
1